Abner Warren Biberman (April 1, 1909 – June 20, 1977) was an American actor, director, and screenwriter.

Early years 
Biberman was born in Milwaukee, Wisconsin, later moving to Philadelphia, Pennsylvania. He gained early acting experience as a student at the Tome School for Boys prep school. He also attended the University of Pennsylvania.

Career 
He was sometimes credited under the pseudonym Joel Judge.

Death 
Biberman died at his home in San Diego, California. His obituary in The New York Times gave his age as 69. He was survived by his wife and three sons.

Filmography

As actor

1936: Soak the Rich
1939: Gunga Din - Chota
1939: Panama Patrol - Arlie Johnson
1939: Panama Lady - Elisha
1939: The Magnificent Fraud - Ruiz
1939: Each Dawn I Die - Shake Edwards (uncredited)
1939: Lady of the Tropics - Wardrobe buyer (uncredited)
1939: The Rains Came - John, the Baptist
1939: The Roaring Twenties - Lefty, Hally's Henchman
1939: Another Thin Man - Dum-Dum, Church's Henchman
1939: Joe and Ethel Turp Call on the President - Extra at Dance (uncredited)
1939: Balalaika - Leo Proplinski
1940: His Girl Friday - Louis "Diamond Louie" Palutso
1940: The Marines Fly High - Gomez (uncredited)
1940: Zanzibar - Aba
1940: Enemy Agent - Baronoff
1940: Ski Patrol - Russian Field Commander
1940: South of Pago Pago - Manuel Ferro
1940: South to Karanga - Manek Sen
1940: Golden Gloves - Torsovitch (uncredited)
1940: Girl from Havana - Captain Lazear
1941: The Monster and the Girl - George, Perry's Aide (uncredited)
1941: Singapore Woman - Singa
1941: The Gay Vagabond - Ratmar
1941: This Woman Is Mine - Lamazie
1941: South of Tahiti - Tahawa
1941: The Devil Pays Off - Carlos Castillo-Martinez
1942: Broadway - Trado
1942: Whispering Ghosts - Mack Wolf
1942: Beyond the Blue Horizon - La'oa
1942: Little Tokyo, U.S.A. - Satsuma
1942: King of the Mounties - Adm. Yamata
1942: Road to Morocco - Man
1943: Submarine Alert - Commander Toyo
1943: Bombardier - Japanese Sergeant (uncredited)
1943: The Leopard Man - Charlie How-Come
1943: Behind the Rising Sun - Inspector (uncredited)
1944: The Bridge of San Luis Rey - Maita
1944: Two-Man Submarine - Gabe Fabian
1944: Dragon Seed - Captain Yasuda (uncredited)
1944: The Keys of the Kingdom - Wai's captain (uncredited)
1945: Betrayal from the East - Yamato
1945: Salome Where She Danced - Dr. Ling
1945: Back to Bataan - Japanese captain at schoolhouse
1945: Captain Kidd - Theodore Blades (uncredited)
1946: Strange Conquest - Molugi
1950: Winchester '73 - Latigo Means
1951: Roaring City - Eddie Page
1952: Viva Zapata! - Captain (uncredited)
1954: Knock on Wood - Maurice Papinek
1954: Elephant Walk - Dr. Pereira
1954: The Golden Mistress - Carl Dexter
1956: The Price of Fear - Mort Kleinman - Pathologist (uncredited)
1974: Kodiak (TV Series) - Abraham Lincoln Imhook (final appearance)

As director

1954: The Golden Mistress
1955: The Looters
1955: Running Wild
1956: The Price of Fear
1956: Behind the High Wall
1957: Gun for a Coward
1957: The Night Runner
1957: Maverick (TV series)
1957: Colt .45 (TV series)
1958: Flood Tide
1958: 77 Sunset Strip (TV series)
1960: National Velvet (TV series)
1961: Ben Casey (TV series)
1962: The Dummy (The Twilight Zone) (TV series)
1962: The Virginian (TV series)
1963: The Outer Limits
1963:  "The Incredible World of Horace Ford" ("The Twilight Zone") (TV series) 
1964: Voyage to the Bottom of the Sea (TV series)
1964: Number 12 Looks Just Like You (The Twilight Zone) (TV series)
1964: I Am the Night—Color Me Black  (The Twilight Zone) (TV series)
1965: Seaway (TV series)
1965: The Trials of O'Brien (TV series)
1965: Gunsmoke (TV series)
1966: Too Many Thieves1969: The Bold Ones: The New Doctors (TV series)
1969-1970: Hawaii Five-O (TV series)

As screenwriter
1954 : The Golden Mistress''

References

External links

1909 births
1977 deaths
20th-century American male actors
American film directors
American male film actors
American television directors
Male actors from Philadelphia
University of Pennsylvania alumni